Empire class may refer to:

 Empire ship, an Empire-class merchant ship used during World War II by the British Government
 Merchant aircraft carrier, an Empire-class merchant ship adapted to both carry grain and carry a limited complement of aircraft for convoy patrol duty